Dahanu Thermal Power Station (DTPS) is a coal based thermal power plant located at coastal Dahanu town in Palghar district in the Indian state of Maharashtra It was constructed by BSES Limited (now Reliance Infrastructure). The power plant operated by Adani Electricity is located on Mumbai-Ahmedabad rail line and is 120 km away from Mumbai and 20 km away from Mumbai-Ahmedabad-Delhi National Highway 8 (India).

Capacity
It has an installed capacity of 500 MW (2x250 MW). The power plant was commissioned in 1995 and is commercially producing power since 1996.

References

Coal-fired power stations in Maharashtra
Palghar district
Reliance Group
1995 establishments in Maharashtra
Energy infrastructure completed in 1995
20th-century architecture in India